UHG may refer to:

 Ukrainian Helsinki Group, a defunct human rights organization
 Unison Healthcare Group, a Taiwanese medical device company
 UnitedHealth Group, a United States healthcare company